Loan Shark is a 1952 American crime film noir directed by Seymour Friedman and starring George Raft.

Plot
An ex-con avenges his brother-in-law's death by infiltrating vicious loan rackets.

Cast
 George Raft as Joe Gargen
 Dorothy Hart as Ann Nelson
 Paul Stewart as Lou Donelli
 John Hoyt as Vince Phillips
 Helen Westcott as Martha Gargen Haines
 Henry Slate as Paul Nelson
 Russell Johnson as Charlie Thompson
 Margia Dean as Ivy
 Benny Baker as Tubby
 Lawrence Dobkin as Walter Kerr (as Larry Dobkin)

Production
The film was based on an original script by Martin Rackin. He originally wrote it for producer Louis Edelman at Warner Bros in 1949.

It was the first production from a new arrangement between Robert Lippert and Famous Artists Corporation whereby clients of Famous Artists would make a film, and Lippert would distribute it. Lipper said he was willing to give away up to 75% of the profits to make the films more attractive to talent, in view of the dwindling B market. The writer, producer and director all had a piece of the film.

Gail Russell was meant to play the female lead but was unable to do so because of personal problems. Raft was paid $25,000 plus 25% of the profits.

Filming started 15 January 1952.

Reception
The Los Angeles Times said the film "will probably fill the bill for those who like this vigorous straight away sort of action film. It sustains its interest."

The New York Times called it "standard fare" which "isn't particularly hard to take. The director... manages to pace the proceedings at a reasonable clip. The screen play... not only affords the cast some brisk dialogue but stirs up a fair amount of suspense, particularly toward the clima... For once, Mr. Raft's tight-lipped suavity seems perfectly in order... "Loan Shark", while nothing special, could have been a lot worse."

Film critic Dennis Schwartz panned the film, writing, "A lifeless thriller about an ex-convict trying to smash a brutal loan-shark racket. Sappy dialogue, an awful plot, and unimaginative directing by Seymour Friedman, make this hardly believable crime story fizzle. The story made about as much sense as snow in July. It is only watchable because George Raft tries to inject into it some Hollywood star pizzazz. But even the final shootout is flat ... This low-budget crime thriller puts all its action into the final shootout scene in a shadowy theater. It had nothing to say about crime or the workforce. The script leaves the impression that all the parties concerned don't seem to have enough brains to walk and chew gum at the same time.

References

External links
 
 
 
 Loan Shark informational page and DVD review at DVD Beaver (includes images)
Review of film at Variety
 

1952 films
1950s crime thriller films
American crime thriller films
American black-and-white films
Film noir
Films about organized crime in the United States
Films directed by Seymour Friedman
Films scored by Heinz Roemheld
Lippert Pictures films
Money lenders
1950s English-language films
1950s American films